The Rotunda is a historic building located at Hermann, Gasconade County, Missouri. It was built about 1864, and is an octagonal, red brick building.  It was built as an exhibition hall for the Gasconade County Agricultural Association and is currently used occasionally for community purposes.

It was listed on the National Register of Historic Places in 1995.

References

Buildings and structures on the National Register of Historic Places in Missouri
Buildings and structures completed in 1864
Buildings and structures in Gasconade County, Missouri
National Register of Historic Places in Gasconade County, Missouri